Forever Top (Asia) Limited is a company based in Hong Kong founded by , the current head of Far East Consortium. The company initially applied for a free-to-air television broadcast licence under the name of New Asia Network (NAN), but it later withdrew the application, and acquired I-Cable Communications instead.

Background
David Chiu is a son of Deacon Chiu Te-ken, the founder of Far East Consortium. Deacon Chiu bought the Rediffusion Television (RTV) in 1982 and renamed it Asia Television (ATV) before he sold the broadcaster in 1989. Forever Top's free-to-air television bid New Asia Network was named in memory of ATV.

New Asia Network
In 2015, Forever Top applied for a free-to-air television broadcast licence under the name of New Asia Network. One of the company's goals was to acquire the assets of ATV, whose licence would be revoked after 1 April 2016.

However, Forever Top later withdrew the application. In 2017, the company instead acquired I-Cable Communications, the parent company of Hong Kong Cable Television and Fantastic Television.

i-Cable Communications

References

2015 establishments in Hong Kong
Mass media companies established in 2015
Television stations in Hong Kong
2017 mergers and acquisitions